is a Japanese professional basketball player, currently playing for the Levanga Hokkaido club of the B.League in Japan. He represented Japan's national basketball team at the 2015 FIBA Asia Championship in Changsha, China.

Career statistics

|-
| align="left" |  2013-14
| align="left" | Aisin
| 54|| || 17.8|| .409|| .367|| .802|| 2.0|| 1.7|| 0.9|| 0|| 5.6
|-
| align="left" |  2014-15
| align="left" | Aisin
| 54|| 24|| 23.3|| .386|| .350|| .868|| 2.1|| 1.4|| 1.0|| 0.0||  5.1
|-
| align="left" |  2015-16
| align="left" | Aisin
| 53||48 || 28.3|| .393|| .358|| .729|| 2.8|| 1.6|| 1.0|| 0.1||6.3 
|-
| align="left" | 2016-17
| align="left" | Mikawa
|43 || 35||21.5 ||.427 ||.378 ||.875 ||2.1 || 1.6||0.7 ||0.0 || 5.7
|-
| align="left" | 2017-18
| align="left" | Mikawa
|52 || 40||25.3 ||.418 ||.390 ||.847 ||2.5 || 3.3||1.3 ||0.0 || 7.0
|-
| align="left" | 2018-19
| align="left" | Ryukyu
|56 || 14||19.0 ||.352 ||.352 ||.833 ||1.7 || 1.9||0.7 ||0.1 || 3.4
|-
|}

References

External links
 FIBA profile
 Asia-basket.com profile
 Real GM profile

1988 births
Living people
Japanese men's basketball players
Levanga Hokkaido players
Point guards
Ryukyu Golden Kings players
SeaHorses Mikawa players
Sportspeople from Fukuoka (city)